Glen Cove or Glencove may refer to: 
Glen Cove, New Jersey, an unincorporated community in Ocean County, New Jersey
Glen Cove, New York, a city in Nassau County, New York
Glencove, Washington, an unincorporated community
Crestwood/Glen Cove, Houston, a neighborhood in Houston, Texas

See also
The Glencoves